Georgia competed at the World Games 2017  in Wroclaw, Poland, from 20 July 2017 to 30 July 2017.

Competitors

Gymnastic

Rhythmic Gymnastics
Georgia  has qualified at the 2017 World Games:

Women's individual event - 1 quota

References 

Nations at the 2017 World Games
2017 in Georgian sport
Georgia (country) at multi-sport events